Kinesin-like protein KIF3C is a protein that in humans is encoded by the KIF3C gene.

References

Further reading

External links 
   

Human genes
Human proteins
Motor proteins